Harbin Aircraft Industry (Group) Co., Ltd. (HAIG), often shortened to Hafei, is an aircraft manufacturing company headquartered in Pingfang District, Harbin, Heilongjiang province, China. It was previously called Harbin Aircraft Manufacturing Corporation (HAMC) in English.

The company was founded in 1952 to manufacture planes for domestic sales, but today it supplies various components for foreign aerospace companies. It is a subsidiary of the Aviation Industry Corporation of China (AVIC).

A former subsidiary of Harbin Aircraft Manufacturing Corporation — Hafei Motor, is one of the major automobile manufactures in China.

History

The 1st factory opened in 1952 to repair aircraft and situated on the former site of the Manchuria Airplane Manufacturing Company (Manshū/Mansyuu) factory. In 1958, it began producing licensed copies of Soviet aircraft. It produced the Z-5, the Mil Mi-4 helicopter, and the H-5 light bomber — a copy of the Ilyushin Il-28.

It then produced the Harbin Y-11 a light twin-engined utility aircraft — an aircraft of its own design and not a licensed copy. The Harbin Y-12 which followed, while similar to the Y-11, was a largely new aircraft.

The most recent and important product is the Z-20 utility helicopter designed and built for the Chinese military.

Subsidiaries
 Hafei Aviation, a manufacturer of light airplanes, helicopters and aerospace parts.
 Hafei Motors, a producer of automobile engines; sedans; MPVs; and mini vehicles, small trucks and vans that see commercial use. Subsidiaries include the auto-making Hafei Motor Co Ltd and the engine maker Harbin Dongan Auto Engine Co.

Major products

Helicopters
Harbin Z-5 - Chinese variant of the Mil Mi-4 transport helicopter
Harbin/CHDRI Z-6 - turboshaft re-design of the Z-5
Harbin Z-9 - medium-weight multipurpose twin-engine helicopter - Chinese variant of the Eurocopter Dauphin
Harbin Z-9W/G - attack helicopter
Harbin Z-19 - reconnaissance and attack helicopter
Harbin Z-20 - a new 10-ton utility helicopter for the PLA Air Force, army and navy. Similar specifications to Sikorsky UH-60 Black Hawk.
Harbin Z-15/EC175 - medium utility helicopter, joint-developed with Eurocopter
HC-120/EC120 - joint-developed with Eurocopter and Singapore Technologies Aerospace, Ltd.

Bombers
Harbin H-5 - Chinese variant of the Ilyushin Il-28 bomber
Harbin SH-5 - amphibious bomber 
HongDian-5 - ECM version of Harbin H-5, being replaced

Patrol/Utility Aircraft
Harbin PS-5 - Patrol Anti-submarine seaplane version of Harbin SH-5
Harbin Y-11 - high wing twin-engine piston utility aircraft

Transports
Harbin Y-12 - utility STOL transport and variant of the Harbin Y-11

Unmanned Aerial vehicles
Harbin BZK-005

Former Production
ERJ 145 - in a joint venture with Embraer
Embraer Legacy 650 - in a joint venture with Embraer

References

External links 

 Official Harbin Aircraft Manufacturing Corporation website 
 哈尔滨飞机工业集团有限责任公司 
 globalsecurity.org

Helicopter manufacturers of China
Aircraft manufacturers of China
Companies based in Harbin
Manufacturing companies established in 1952
Government-owned companies of China
Defence companies of the People's Republic of China
Chinese companies established in 1952